Patissa virginea is a moth in the family Crambidae. It was described by Philipp Christoph Zeller in 1863. It is found in the Democratic Republic of the Congo, Mozambique, South Africa, Taiwan, India and Sri Lanka.

Description
The wingspan is 22 mm. The forewings are pure white. Palpi and legs slightly tinged with fulvous color. Forewings sometimes with a black speck at the upper angle of the cell.

References

Moths described in 1863
Schoenobiinae